Resolution is a 2006 album by instrumental rock solo artist Andy Timmons.

Track listing
Deliver Us – 4:02
Helipad' – 4:47
Ghost of You – 5:07
Resolution – 5:39
Redemption – 3:42
Lydia – 3:43
Gone (9/11/01) – 3:49
Move On – 2:58
Beware Dark Days – 6:06
The Prayer / The Answer – 4:52
Headed For The Ditch – 3:18 (hidden track)

Personnel
 Andy Timmons - Guitars
 Mike Daane - Bass
 Mitch Marine - Drums

References

2006 albums
Instrumental rock albums
Favored Nations albums